Moorabbin (Harry Hawker) Airport  is a mostly general aviation airport for light aircraft located in between the southern Melbourne suburbs of Heatherton, Cheltenham, Dingley Village and Mentone. It also receives commercial airline service. The airport grounds are treated as their own suburb, and share the postcode 3194 with the neighboring suburb of Mentone.  With a total of 274,082 aircraft movements, Moorabbin Airport was the second busiest airport in Australia for the calendar year 2011.

History
The airport opened in December 1949. Originally the intent was to name the airport "Mentone" but this was abandoned after a potential clash with the then French airport in Menton.  Similarly, Cheltenham was discarded due to similarities to the Gloucestershire Airport near Cheltenham in South West England. The name comes from the nearby (but not neighboring) suburb of Moorabbin.  The airport was renamed to Moorabbin (Harry Hawker) Airport on 22 January 1989, after pioneering Australian aviator Harry George Hawker, on the centenary date of Hawker's birth.

Accidents and incidents
 On 3 April 1953, an Avro Anson plane crash landed at the airport. The five-man crew escaped unharmed.
 On 19 October 1970, a Beech D50B light aircraft collided mid-air with a Bell 47G-3B-2 helicopter over the suburb of Moorabbin while on approach to Moorabbin airport. Both aircraft subsequently crashed to the ground and burst into flames. All 5 on board both aircraft died in the crash.
 On 14 February 1995, a Hughes 300 helicopter crashed into Port Phillip bay near Aspendale during a ferry flight from Geelong to Moorabbin airport for repairs. The tail boom failed in flight causing loss of control and subsequent crash into the shallow waters near the beach. The sole occupant, the pilot, died in the crash.
 On 18 March 2000, a Cessna 210E performed a ditching into a quarry in Heatherton, near Moorabbin Airport after experiencing a loss of performance. The aircraft had been performing an evaluation flight near the airport when it experienced difficulties. The pilot and both passengers evacuated the aircraft safely, however one passenger drowned before reaching land due to being unable to swim.
 On 29 July 2002, two Cessna 172Rs collided while on short final landing approach at Moorabbin airport following night circuit training. Both aircraft became entangled and crashed on the runway with subsequent fires. Both occupants from one aircraft evacuated safely, however the sole occupant of the other aircraft died in the crash.
 On 27 August 2008, a Cessna 150M was involved in a mid-air collision with a Piper PA-28 Cherokee near Moorabbin airport during training flights. Immediately upon the collision, the Cessna lost control and crashed into a garage in the suburb of Cheltenham bursting into flames and causing fatal injuries to the pilot, the sole occupant. The Piper was able to limp back to the airport where both occupants escaped injuries.
 On 7 August 2010, a Cessna 152 was involved in a serious incident after crashing into a backyard of a home in Mordialloc while on approach to nearby Moorabbin airport. The aircraft's engine failed as a result of fuel starvation. Both occupants escaped with only minor injuries and the aircraft was written off after sustaining major damage.
 On 11 August 2015, a Cessna 172 (VH-EUU) and a Piper PA-28 (VH-TXH) collided on the ground after TXH had a rough running engine and landed on Runway 22/04, After touchdown, TXH elected it would not be able to stop on the runway and began to overshoot onto grass, and onto taxiway Alfa, where EUU was taxiing. EUU was advised to stop by the SMC, but elected to continue to avoid a direct collision with TXH, TXH veered right in attempt to avoid EUU, However, the left wing of TXH then collided with the tail of EUU. The pilot of TXH was not injured. The pilot and passengers of EUU were treated for minor injuries. Both aircraft sustained substantial damage.
 On 8 June 2018, a pilot of a light plane, Cessna 172 (VH-EWE), died when his plane crashed and burst into flames in a street in Mordialloc, on short final for runway 35L. ATC recordings indicated he had an engine failure on approach, an ATSB report has been unable to find a cause behind this accident.
 On 30 November 2022, a Hughes 269C helicopter crashed into a residential structure in Mentone. The sole student pilot was seriously injured.

Facilities 
Moorabbin Airport, one of four in the city, serves the general aviation needs for the south-eastern suburbs of Melbourne. Usually, two parallel runways are used at the same time. The airport also has a control tower. The airport is home to the Royal Victorian Aero Club, the Australian National Aviation Museum and several flight training facilities, including a campus of multinational pilot training organization CAE Oxford Aviation Academy.

Airlines and destinations

Master plan 
The master plan for Moorabbin Airport was approved by the federal Minister for Infrastructure Anthony Albanese MP, on 25 June 2010. The master plan provides a twenty-year horizon detailing the development of the airport and associated infrastructure.

A draft Major Development Plan for Moorabbin Airport drawn up by the Australian company Wesfarmers was refused by Albanese, on 5 August 2013. The draft plan was for the development of large retail outlets on 4.8 hectares of airport land at the corner of Centre Dandenong Road and Boundary Road. The proposal had a floor area of 14,500m2.

See also 
 List of airports in Victoria
 Transportation in Australia

References

External links 
 
 Australian National Aviation Museum - Moorabbin Air Museum website
 Harry George Hawker

Airports in Victoria (Australia)
Transport in Melbourne
Buildings and structures in the City of Kingston (Victoria)
Suburbs of Melbourne
Suburbs of the City of Kingston (Victoria)
Airports established in 1949
1949 establishments in Australia
Cheltenham, Victoria